Charles Wright Academy is a private college preparatory school in University Place, Washington, offering Preschool to Grade 12. It was founded as an all-boys private school since its inception in 1957 and began admitting girls in 1970.

History 
The idea for Charles Wright Academy was developed in 1947, when Annie Wright Seminary, an all-girls school (at the time), took in some of the students from kindergarten, first, and second grade of Lowell Elementary in Tacoma when their school was damaged by an earthquake. Pleased with the functioning of the school the parents urged to continue the school as co-ed and further including higher grades which was declined.

Sam and Nathalie Brown approached Bishop Stephen Bayne of the Episcopal Diocese of Olympia who directed them to take the plan forward. They along with other interested parents purchased 127 acres on Chambers Creek Road and began functioning as a private boys school as approved by Washington Office of the Superintendent of Public Instruction. Their first year in 1957 included 40 boys and five faculty members. In 1970, Charles Wright Academy decided to admit girls and has been co-ed ever since. It was named Charles Wright Academy in honor of Charles Barstow Wright.

They provide grades from Preschool to 12. CWA is a member of the National Association of Independent Schools (NAIS) and the Northwest Association of Independent Schools (NWAIS).

It is located in the 107-acre campus in Tacoma, Washington and follows a non-sectarian religious affiliation.

Academics and faculty 
CWA has a total of 84 teachers among whom 61% have advanced degrees. They have an average of 16 students per class and offers 16 AP courses.

Athletics 
A total of 11 sports are offered which includes; baseball, basketball, cross country, football, golf, soccer, tennis, track and field, ultimate frisbee, and volleyball. They also offer theatre and knowledge bowl which count towards sports credit. There are numerous student-run clubs at the school.

Student accomplishments 
 The sailing team at CWA came first in the 2017 NWISA Double-handed Championship and earned the honor of representing the Pacific Northwest on the national stage.
 In 2017, they won in Cougars' home debut.
 CWA also won in the FIRST Robotics Competition Nisqually League championship.
 In 2019, the CWA Knowledge Bowl team won first in state in the 2A division. In 2022 they earned 2nd in state in the 2A division.
 Historic placements include first place in 2017, 2015, 2013, 2009, 2008, 2006, 2005, 2004, 2001, 2000, 1999, 1998, 1997, and 1996, in various divisions ranging from a joint A/B to 4A.
 In spring of 2019, the Envirothon team won 2nd in Pierce County and 3rd in the overall South Sound region.

Notable alumni
Penn Badgley, actor
Jonah Bergman, bassist of Schoolyard Heroes
Steve Bonnell, guitarist of Schoolyard Heroes
J'Nai Bridges, opera singer
Ryann Donnelly, lead vocalist of Schoolyard Heroes
Nate Mondou, baseball player

Notable faculty
Sarah Sadlier, historian

References 

Schools in Tacoma, Washington